Troy D. Romero is an American politician and businessman serving as a member of the Louisiana House of Representatives from the 37th district. Elected in November 2019, he assumed office on January 13, 2020.

Early life and education 
A native of Iowa, Louisiana, Romero graduated from Welsh High School and attended Louisiana State University.

Career 
Romero is the owner of Sports Turf Specialists, a company that installs turf on athletic fields. He was elected to the Louisiana House of Representatives in November 20019 and assumed office on January 13, 2020.

References 

Living people
Republican Party members of the Louisiana House of Representatives
People from Iowa, Louisiana
People from Calcasieu Parish, Louisiana
Year of birth missing (living people)